Oluoch is a surname. Notable persons with this name include:

Ben Oluoch (1963/1966–2018), Kenyan broadcaster and politician
Boniface Oluoch (born 1986), Kenyan footballer
Lucas Oluoch (born 1991), Kenyan cricketer
Wycliffe Juma Oluoch (born 1980), Kenyan footballer